Domingo Felipe Cavallo (born July 21, 1946) is an Argentine economist and politician. Between 1991 and 1996 he was Economic Ministry of Argentina during Carlos Menem presidency. He is known for implementing the Convertibility plan, which established a pseudo-currency board with the  dollar and allowed the dollar to be used for legal contracts. This brought the inflation rate down from over 1,300% in 1990 to less than 20% in 1992 and nearly to zero during the rest of the 1990s. He implemented pro-market reforms which included privatizations of state enterprises. Productivity per hour worked during his 5-years as minister of Menem increased by more than 100%.

In 2001, he was Economic Ministry for nine months during the 1998–2002 Argentine great depression. During a bank run he implemented a restriction on cash withdrawing, known as corralito. This was followed by riots and the fall of President Fernando de la Rúa.

He is Doctor in Economic Sciences from the National University of Córdoba and obtained his PhD in Economics from Harvard University. He received five Honoris Causa doctorates from the Universities of Genoa, Turin, Bologna, Ben-Gurion and Paris Pantheon-Sorbonne. He was professor at the National and Catholic Universities of Córdoba, and at New York, Harvard and Yale Universities.

Early years
Cavallo was born in San Francisco, Córdoba Province to Florencia and Felipe Cavallo, Italian Argentine immigrants from the Piedmont Region.

He graduated with honors in Accounting (1967) and Economics (1968) at the National University of Córdoba, where he earned his doctorate in economics in 1970. He married the former Sonia Abrazián in 1968, and had three children. He would later enroll at Harvard University, where he earned a second doctorate in Economics in 1977.

He taught at the National University of Córdoba (1969–84), the Catholic University of Córdoba (1970–74), and New York University (1996–97). He wrote a number of books and was publisher of Forbes in 1998–99.

Central Bank
In July 1982, after the Falklands War fiasco brought more moderate leadership to the military dictatorship, Cavallo was appointed president of the Central Bank. He inherited the country's most acute financial and economic crisis since 1930, and a particularly heinous Central Bank regulation painfully remembered as the Central Bank Circular 1050.

Implemented in 1980 at the behest of conservative Minister of Economy, José Alfredo Martínez de Hoz, policy tied adjustable loan installments (nearly all lending in Argentina is on an adjustable interest basis) to the value of the US dollar locally. Exchange rates were controlled at the time and therefore raised little concern. The next February, however, the peso was sharply devalued and continued to plummet for the rest of 1981 and into 1982. Mortgage and business borrowers saw their monthly installments increase over tenfold in just a year and many, including homeowners just months away from paying off their loans, unable to keep up, either lost their entire equity or everything outright.

Cavallo immediately rescinded the hated Circular 1050 and as a result, saved millions of homeowners and small-business owners from financial ruin (as well as millions more, indirectly). What followed, however, remained the subject of great controversy.

Though nothing new to the economic history of Argentina, he is often accused of implementing financial policies that may have allowed Argentina's main private enterprises to transfer their debts to the state, transforming their private debt into public obligations. During 1982 and 1983, more than 200 firms (30 economic groups and 106 transnational enterprises) transferred a great part of their 17 billion dollar debt to the federal government, thanks to secured exchange rates on loan installments. This fraud took place both before and after his very brief turn at the Central Bank, but not while he was in charge. In a speech in September 1982 he was forced renounce and express his opposition to the transfer of debt to the state. He inherited this practice from Martínez de Hoz himself (whose chief interest, steelmaker Acindar, had unloaded US$700 million of its debts in this way). Moreover, Cavallo subjected payments covered by these exchange rate guarantees to indexation; this latter stipulation was dropped by his successor, Julio González del Solar.

Beginnings in politics

His involvement in politics began when he was elected as a student representative to the highest government body of the Economics School (1965–1966). He acted as Undersecretary of Development of the provincial government (1969–1970), director (1971–1972) and vice chairman of the board (1972–1973) of the Provincial Bank and Undersecretary of Interior of the national government.

This controversy notwithstanding, upon Argentina's return to democracy in December 1983, he became a close economic advisor to Peronist politician José Manuel de la Sota and was elected as a Peronist deputy for Córdoba Province in the 1987 mid-term polls.

Drawing from his Fundación Mediterránea think-tank, he prepared an academic team for taking over the management of the economy, and to that end he participated actively in Carlos Menem's bid for the presidency in 1989. President Alfonsín's efforts to control hyperinflation (which reached 200% a month in July 1989) failed, and led to food riots and Alfonsín's resignation.

Minister of Foreign relations

As Foreign Minister, in 1989 he met with British Foreign Secretary John Major, this being the first such meeting since the end of the Falklands War seven years earlier.

As Menem initially chose to deliver the Economy Ministry to senior executives of the firm Bunge y Born, Cavallo had to wait a few more years to put his economic theories into practice. He served as Menem's foreign minister, and was instrumental in the realignment of Argentina with the Washington Consensus advanced by U.S. President George H. W. Bush. Finally, after several false starts, and two further peaks of hyperinflation, Menem put Cavallo at the helm of the Argentine Economy Ministry in February, 1991.

Minister of Economy at the Menem administration

In May 1989, amid the worst economic crisis in the country's history, Carlos Menem was elected President of Argentina.

Hyperinflation forced him to abandon peronist orthodoxy in favour of a fiscally conservative, market-oriented economic policy.

Domingo Cavallo was appointed in 1991, and deepened the liberalization of the economy. He liberalized trade (by removing export taxes and reducing import duties, removing non-tariff barriers to imports, and removing restrictions on foreign investment).

He reformed the State and recreated a market economy based on a reduction in public spending and the fiscal deficit (through the privatization of state companies; the elimination of price controls, wage controls and currency controls; and the elimination of trade subsidies).

He reformed the tax policy to simplify taxes and reduce non-social government spending, and reached an agreement with the International Monetary Fund to achieve the path towards adherence to a Brady Plan a plan about the debt restructuring.

These reforms were a success: the capital flights ended, interest rates were lowered, inflation fell to single digits, and economic activity increased; in that year alone, the gross domestic product grew at a rate of 10,5%.

He was the ideologist behind the Convertibility Plan, which created a currency board that fixed the dollar-peso exchange rate at 1 peso per US dollar; he signed his plan into law on April 1, 1991. Cavallo thus succeeded in defeating inflation, which had averaged over 220% (1975–1988), had leapt to 5000% (1989) and remained at 1300% (1990).

President Menem had already privatized the state telecom concern and national airlines (the once-premier airline in Latin America, Aerolíneas Argentinas, which was later almost run into the ground). The stability Cavallo's plan helped bring about, however, opened prospects for more privatizations than ever. Going on to total over 200 state enterprises, these included: the costly state railroads concern, the state oil monopoly Yacimientos Petrolíferos Fiscales, several public utilities, two government television stations, 10,000 km (6000 mi) of roads, steel and petrochemical firms, grain elevators, hotels, subways and even racetracks. A panoply of provincial and municipal banks were sold to financial giants abroad (sometimes over the opposition of their respective governors and mayors) and, taking a page from the Chile pension system privatization, the mandatory National Pension System was opened to choice through the authorization of private pension schemes.

GDP, long stuck at its 1973 level even with a growing population, grew by about a third from early 1991 to late 1994. Fixed investment, depressed since the 1981–82 crisis, more than doubled during this period.

Consumers also benefited: income poverty fell by about half (to under 20%) and new auto sales (likewise depressed since 1982) jumped fivefold, to about 500,000 units. This boom, however, had its problems early on. Tight federal budgets kept the budget deficits of the provinces from improving and, though many benefited from Cavallo's insistence that large employers translate higher productivity into higher pay, this same productivity boom (as well as the nearly 200,000 layoffs the privatizations caused) helped unemployment jump from about 7% in 1991–92 to over 12%, by 1994.

The 1995 Mexican Crisis shocked consumer and business confidence and ratcheted joblessness to 18% (the highest since the 1930s). Confidence and the economy recovered relatively quickly; but, the consequences of double-digit unemployment soon created a crime wave that to some extent continues to this day. Unemployment and poverty eased only very slowly after the return to growth in early 1996.

Independent

In mid-1995, Cavallo denounced the existence of presumed "mafias" entrenched within the circles of power. After his first public accusations, relations between Cavallo, President Menem and his colleagues became progressively strained.

In 1996, shortly after Menem's reelection, the flux of money from privatisation ceased, and Cavallo was ousted from the cabinet, due to his volatile personality and fights with other cabinet members, coupled with staggering unemployment and social unrest caused by his economic policies and the Mexican crisis. Following months of speculation, Menem asked for his resignation on July 26, 1996.

Cavallo founded a political party, Action for the Republic, which allowed him to return to Congress since 1997, this time as a National Deputy for the City of Buenos Aires.

Cavallo ran for president in 1999, but was defeated by Fernando de la Rúa. Cavallo came in third place and received 11% of the vote, far behind both de la Rúa and the other main candidate, Peronist Eduardo Duhalde.

He also ran for Mayor of Buenos Aires in 2000, got second place and lost to Aníbal Ibarra.

Minister of Economy with de la Rúa and during the crisis

Cavallo was called by President de la Rúa in March 2001 to lead the economy once again, in the face of a weakened coalition government and two years of recession.

He attempted to restore business confidence by renegotiating the external debt with the International Monetary Fund and with bondholders, but the growing country risk and spiraling put options by large investors and foreign holdings led to a bank run and a massive capital flight. In late November 2001, Cavallo introduced a set of measures that blocked the usage of cash, informally known as the corralito ("financial corral"). The anger of those Argentines with the means to invest abroad created a framework for the popular middle-class protest termed the cacerolazo.

Political pressure by the Peronist opposition and other organized economic interests coincided with the December 2001 riots. This critical situation finally forced Cavallo, and then de la Rúa, to resign.

A series of Peronist presidents came and left in the next few days, until Eduardo Duhalde, the opponent of De la Rua and Cavallo in the 1999 presidential election, took power on January 2, 2002. Soon afterwards the government decreed the end of peso-dollar convertibility, devalued the peso and soon afterwards let it float, which led to a swift depreciation (the exchange rate briefly reached 4 pesos per dollar in July 2002) and inflation (about 40% in 2002).

Cavallo's policies are viewed by opponents as major causes of the deindustrialization and the rise of unemployment, poverty and crime endured by Argentina in the late 1990s, as well as the collapse of 2001, the ensuing default of the Argentine public debt.

After the crisis

Between April and June 2002, Cavallo was jailed for alleged participation in illegal weapons sales during the Menem administration. He was exonerated of all charges related to this scandal in 2005.

Cavallo served as the Robert Kennedy Visiting Professor in Latin American Studies in the department of economics at Harvard University from 2003 to 2004.

He has also continued to serve as a member of the influential Washington-based financial advisory body, the Group of Thirty.

As of January 2012, Cavallo is a senior fellow at the Jackson Institute for Global Affairs at Yale University as well as a visiting lecturer at Yale's economics department.

Cavallo returned to Córdoba Province in 2013 to run for Chamber of Deputies under the Es Posible ticket, led by center-right Peronist Alberto Rodríguez Saá. Winning only 1.28% of the provincial vote, Cavallo failed to reach the required 1.5% threshold in the primaries elections, and was disqualified from the running for the general election in what the local press described as "an emphatic defeat."

Criminal sentence 
On December 1, 2015, Cavallo, ex president Carlos Saul Menem, and ex justice minister Raúl Granillo Ocampo, were found guilty of embezzlement by the court Tribunal Oral Federal 4.

Honour

Foreign honour
  : Honorary Commander of the Order of the Defender of the Realm (P.M.N.) (1994)

References

External links

 Personal homepage (in Spanish and English)
 

1946 births
Living people
Group of Thirty
Argentine people of Italian descent
People from Córdoba Province, Argentina
National University of Córdoba alumni
Harvard Graduate School of Arts and Sciences alumni
Members of the Argentine Chamber of Deputies elected in Buenos Aires
Members of the Argentine Chamber of Deputies elected in Córdoba
Presidents of the Central Bank of Argentina
Foreign ministers of Argentina
Argentine economists
Argentine Ministers of Finance
Argentine anti-communists
Candidates for President of Argentina
Justicialist Party politicians
Action for the Republic politicians
Articles containing video clips
Argentine politicians convicted of corruption